Genesis: Together and Apart is a 2014 documentary about the English rock band Genesis and its members' solo projects. Made by the BBC, it was first broadcast on BBC Two in the UK on 4 October 2014. It was the first time drummer and singer Phil Collins, former singer Peter Gabriel, keyboardist Tony Banks, bassist Mike Rutherford and guitarist Steve Hackett had reunited since the Six of the Best reunion concert (1982).
The documentary was released on DVD and Blu-ray in November 2014 as Genesis: Sum of the Parts. The companion box set R-Kive  also features tracks from the band member's solo albums.

Reception

The Daily Telegraph'''s reviewer Ceri Radford described the documentary as "excellent" and "an entertaining riff on their success over the years". Writing for The Arts Desk, Adam Sweeting was not as impressed. He stated: "All of the group's serpentine twists and turns were dutifully recorded in this 90-minute documentary", but he concluded: "It's an awesome tale in its way, yet the endless list of hit records and enormous tours eventually became tedious, and somehow Genesis managed to remain untouched by all the history going on around them."

Following its broadcast, guitarist Steve Hackett expressed his displeasure, describing the documentary as a "biased account of Genesis history" that "totally ignores" his solo work. "I tend to agree with him," remarked Rutherford. "I emailed him to say that. But it wasn't our fault; we weren't entirely in charge [of the editing]." Hackett's screentime was also noticeably minimal and his fans were mostly supportive of his complaint, posting hundreds of comments hailing his music and career.

The documentary was also criticised by some fans as it featured no mention of Ray Wilson or his three-year tenure with the band, and also features very little information on Selling England by the Pound (1973) and Wind & Wuthering'' (1976) – both very popular among fans – along with several other aspects of the band's history.

References

External links

Genesis (band) video albums
2014 video albums
Documentary films about rock music and musicians